Opalton is a rural locality in the Shire of Winton, Queensland, Australia. In the  Opalton had a population of 64 people. The Opalton township is located adjacent to the Opalton Opal Field, one of the largest and most extensively worked opal deposits in Queensland.

Geography 
There are two protected areas within the locality:

 Bladensburg National Park in the north-west of the locality
 Lark Quarry Conservation Park in the centre of the locality
Apart from the protected areas, the land use is grazing on native vegetation.

History 
In the  Opalton had a population of 64 people.

Attractions 
Lark Quarry Conservation Park is at the end of Lark Quarry Access Road. It has the world’s only known dinosaur stampede site.

Scrammy Lookout is in Bladensburg National Park.

The Opalton Opal Field is popular with tourists as a place for fossicking.

References 

Shire of Winton
Mining towns in Queensland
Localities in Queensland